Lillian Rose Vorhaus Kruskal Oppenheimer (October 24, 1898 in New York City – July 24, 1992) was an American origami pioneer. She popularized origami in the West starting in the 1950s, and is credited with popularizing the Japanese term origami in English-speaking circles, which gradually supplanted the literal translation paper folding that had been used earlier. In the 1960s she co-wrote several popular books on origami with Shari Lewis.

Lillian Oppenheimer ran an informal group of dedicated folders in the New York City area, and in 1978 she co-founded, with Alice Gray and Michael Shall, the non-profit Friends of the Origami Center. After Oppenheimer's death, it was renamed OrigamiUSA.  it is the largest origami organization in the United States.

Oppenheimer was born to a Jewish family of Austrian, Hungarian, and Czech origin, the daughter of Bernard Vorhaus, an attorney who made a living importing furs. Oppenheimer is the mother of William, Molly, Rosaly, Martin, and Joseph. The three sons were all prominent mathematicians.

Books

Notes

External links

Photo of Lillian Oppenheimer on Origami USA website

1898 births
1992 deaths
Origami artists
American Jews